Juan Carlos Lueiza Muñoz (born 13 August 1991) is a Chilean footballer that currently plays for Chilean Primera División club Cobresal as central midfielder.

External links
 
 Juan Carlos Lueiza at Football-Lineups

1991 births
Living people
Chilean footballers
Cobresal footballers
Provincial Talagante footballers
Chilean Primera División players
Association football midfielders